The men's 50 metre freestyle event at the 2022 Commonwealth Games will be held on 2 and 3 August at the Sandwell Aquatics Centre.

Records
Prior to this competition, the existing world, Commonwealth and Games records were as follows:

Schedule
The schedule is as follows:

All times are British Summer Time (UTC+1)

Results

Heats

Semifinals

Final

References

Men's 50 metre freestyle
Commonwealth Games